Catherine Helen Berndt, née Webb (8 May 1918 – 12 May 1994), born in Auckland, was an Australian anthropologist known for her research in Australia and Papua New Guinea. She was awarded in 1950 the Percy Smith Medal from the University of Otago, New Zealand and in 1980 she received a children's book award and medal for her book, Land of the Rainbow Snake, a collection of stories from Western Arnhem Land.

Biography 
Berndt published valuable monographs on Aboriginal Australians, including Women's Changing ceremonies in Northern Australia (1950). She authored over 36 major publications about women's social and religious life in Australia, New Zealand, and Papua New Guinea, plus a dozen co-authored publications with others. One of Berndt’s best known collaborators from the aboriginal communities was the Maung woman Mondalmi, who worked with her.

For her work, Berndt was elected an Honorary Fellow of the Royal Anthropological Institute in London. She was also the 7th woman elected as a Fellow in the Academy of the Social Sciences in Australia.

With her husband Ronald Berndt, C. Berndt collected Indigenous art works of Australia and Asia. The collection is conserved in the Berndt Museum of Anthropology, founded by the couple in 1976 (University of Western Australia).

She died in 1994.

Selected works
 (co-author)
Arnhem Land: Its history and its people (co-author)
 (about the Wawalag myth)

References

External links
 

1918 births
1994 deaths
Australian anthropologists
Australian women anthropologists
Fellows of the Academy of the Social Sciences in Australia
20th-century anthropologists
New Zealand emigrants to Australia